Brighton United F.C. were an association football club based in Brighton, Sussex who were active for a few years at the end of the 19th century.

History

The club joined the Southern League in 1898. Their first match was at Southampton where they played the inaugural match at the hosts' new stadium, The Dell, on 3 September 1898. In their first match Brighton fielded a team including nine Scottish players, several of whom had played in the Football League, including the scorer of their consolation goal in a 4–1 defeat, Roddy McLeod.

Former Football League or Scottish Football League players included:
Jock Caldwell, full back formerly with Woolwich Arsenal
Joe Clark, inside forward formerly with Dundee
Patrick Farrell, centre half formerly with Woolwich Arsenal
Billy Hendry, full back formerly with West Bromwich Albion, Stoke, Preston North End and Sheffield United
William Longair, centre half formerly with Newton Heath, Sunderland and Burnley
Willie McArthur, forward, formerly with Bolton Wanderers, Leicester Fosse  and Dundee
Francis McAvoy, wing half formerly with Woolwich Arsenal
Roddy McLeod, forward, formerly with West Bromwich Albion and Leicester Fosse

Maurice Parry played for Brighton United in the 1899–1900 season, before having a long career with Liverpool and making 16 appearances for Wales.

Brighton were moderately successful in their first season in the Southern League finishing in tenth place (out of 13), but they had over-reached themselves financially and were forced to release McLeod and several other players before the end of the season. They started the 1899–1900 season but resigned in March 1900 with four games left to play, with their record then being expunged.

References

External links
Details on Football Club History Database
Article about William Avenell – founder

Defunct football clubs in England
Association football clubs disestablished in 1900
Brighton & Hove Albion F.C.
Southern Football League clubs
Sport in Brighton and Hove
1900 disestablishments in England
Defunct football clubs in East Sussex